St. Xavier's College, Asansol, is a general degree college in Asansol, Paschim Bardhaman District, West Bengal, India. It is a minority Institution managed by the Society of Jesus with the registration of St. Xavier's College Education Trust, Asansol. It offers undergraduate courses in arts, commerce and sciences. It had been affiliated to  Kazi Nazrul University, Asansol.

Courses 
The college presently offers the honors BA in a combination of English, Geography, History, Political Science, and Economics as well as an honors BCom in Accountancy.

See also
 List of institutions of higher education in West Bengal
 Education in India
 Education in West Bengal
 List of Jesuit sites

References

External links
Website
Kazi Nazrul University
University Grants Commission
National Assessment and Accreditation Council

Colleges affiliated to Kazi Nazrul University
Universities and colleges in Paschim Bardhaman district
Education in Asansol
Educational institutions established in 2015
2015 establishments in West Bengal
Jesuit universities and colleges in India